Vasiliy Sergeyevich Oshchepkov; (January 7, 1893 - October 10, 1938) was a Russian researcher of different types of national wrestling and martial arts. He was ranked as a Merited Master of Sports of the USSR and an Honored Coach of the USSR. He was one of the founders of Sambo, a martial art developed in the Soviet Union. During the political purges of 1937, Oshchepkov was accused of being a Japanese spy, and was executed in prison as a result.

Early life

Very little is known about Vasili Oshchepkov's earlier life before adulthood. However, he became an orphan by 8.

Education at the Kodokan

After the transfer of South Sakhalin to the Japanese in 1905 under the Treaty of Portsmouth, Vasily who remained a complete orphan in 1904 came to the attention of the Russian Orthodox mission in Japan. He was sent to study on the island of Honshu in Japan, where he first studied from September 1907 at a seminary in Kyoto, where only clergymen were trained. There he became interested in judo and, in the direction of a judo teacher from the seminary, was admitted to the Kodokan and transferred to the Tokyo Theological Seminary at the Orthodox Mission, organized by the future St. Nicholas of Japan. in the Orthodox mission, organized by the future St Nicholas of Japan. In the seminary he studied judo, and, on the recommendation of the coach as the best judoka at the Seminary Vasily was admitted to the entrance examinations and admitted to the Kodokan Judo Institute in Tokyo, founded by Jigoro Kano, on October 29, 1911. On June 15, 1913 Oshchepkov received the first degree black belt - shodan (first dan); in October 1917, during a trip to Japan, he passed the exams to receive his second degree black belt, becoming the first Russian and the third European to get a nidan in judo. Ranks in judo did not go to tenth degree, as now, but only fifth degree.

Work in intelligence
After finishing seminary in 1913, he returned to Russia and worked as a translator in counterintelligence, first as a Zaamurskogo border guard in Harbin, then in the Department of Counterintelligence at Vladivostok Fortress, Amur Military District, in Vladivostok. In 1914, he founded Russia's first judo school and the world's first international judo competition held in 1915. He repeatedly went on business trips to Japan and in 1918 he taught judo to police in Vladivostok.

In 1919 he worked for the Siberian Army and in the Japanese Office of Military Field Communications as an interpreter. During this period he, through a colleague, fellow countryman and fellow student at the Tokyo Seminary Trofim Yurkevich, established a connection with the Communist Party of the Soviet Union. At the same time, enterprising Oshchepkov tries to earn: he opens a school for teaching the Japanese language, participates in trade operations with Japan, and even buys a film projector.

After the withdrawal of Japanese troops from Primorye Oshchepkov, he received an offer of cooperation with Soviet intelligence, and on September 1, 1923 had given a written cooperation with the Division of Human Intelligence of the 5th Army of the Red Army, and was then sent to the North Sakhalin, which until 1925, still remained under Japanese occupation.

In 1924 Oshchepkov returned to Japan under the guise of the owner inherited from his father's houses in Alexandrovsk and Booker: under a Japanese law film the distributor was obliged to arrange preferential sessions for military personnel. His reports in the Soviet Union had an important practical meaning, for example, allowed to withdraw Japanese troops from the north of Sakhalin, but because of disagreements with his incompetent superiors in 1926 had to return to the USSR, where he was accused of embezzling state-owned assets. To compensate for 3140 yen spent on agents, but not backed by receipts, he had to sell almost all private property, including the projector.

Work in the Siberian military district
At the headquarters of the Siberian Military District, he was not going to lose highly yaponista and Oshchepkov left Vladivostok as a translator. The January 27, 1927 order of the number 26 Revvovensoveta USSR "Oshchepkov Vasily Sergeyevich determined to serve in the Red Army." Then on this basis, "the order of the Siberian Military District for the number 19" VS Oshchepkov "shall be appointed interpreter of the 7th District Headquarters Branch" in Novosibirsk, with the appointment has been issued retroactively - from 15 April 1926, with the payment of all laid during this period allowance.

Almost all means Oshchepkova went for treatment for his sick wife. He began to try to get into Moscow or Leningrad, where they could provide more effective medical care and have a higher salary. As a result, in September 1929, he was summoned to Moscow. His wife by this time, had already died.

Popularization of judo in the USSR and the creation of Sambo
In 1914, immediately after his arrival in Russia, Oshchepkov organized in the Vladivostok circle of Judo, which functioned at the address. Ship Embankment. 21 (now - the Sports Club of the Pacific Fleet), what in June 1915, an article appeared in the Moscow magazine "Hercules". In 1917 in Vladivostok, the first in the history of the much-touted international match Judo:  Oshchepkova students competed with students of Japanese Higher Commercial School Otaru, came to Vladivostok that such an international match was in 1915.

In 1927, at a meeting in the Novosibirsk Osoaviahima cell at the headquarters of the Siberian Military District, Oshchepkov made a story about judo, then immediately it was decided to arrange for headquarters staff study group techniques of self-defense. Specialist services rushed to take advantage of a rare and local society "Dynamo".

Immediately after the transfer to Moscow  Oshchepkov opened at the Central House of the Red Army (CDKA) two-month course "dzyuu-up" (writing at the time). After the first demonstrations in CSKA Moscow immediately created two groups of military personnel and Army House, as well as the country's first female group.

In 1929 he became a teacher at the Russian State University of Physical Education, Sport, Youth and Tourism. Work at the Institute of Physical Education gave Oshchepkov unique insight into the struggle of the peoples of the USSR systems, whose representatives were trained in his chair. He analyzed the bayonet, international sports, martial arts, Chinese martial arts and a number of national kinds of struggle in terms of their applicability in a combat encounter. On the basis of this analysis, Oshchepkov amalgamated the underlying movement patterns to create a martial art better suited for war-based combat which later became known as Sambo.

In 1930, with the direct participation Oshchepkova was prepared and published "Guidelines for the physical preparation of the Red Army," and in 1931 - textbook "Exercise of the Red Army," where for the first time a program was set for a comprehensive program of training fighting. In parallel with the publication of teaching materials VS Oshchepkov held special courses for officers of the Moscow garrison, and then turned to the job of instructor-methodological Office of the Moscow garrison committee, directly himself carried the teaching of martial arts in several military units, and also took part in the competitions Moscow garrison commanders on the bayonet, taking first place there.

In 1931, the Soviet Union developed a sports complex Ready for Labour and Defence of the USSR. In 1932, the complex was established by the TRP of the second stage, in which, as one of the rules of self-defense techniques appeared. Development of a set of techniques for the TRP-II on behalf of the Special Commission, chaired by Sergey Kamenev was engaged  Oshchepkov.

In 1930, on the basis of CSKA Moscow, but through the sports committee, VS Oshchepkov conducted special training of trainers, which were trained physical education teachers from various regions of the country. Among them was Alexander Rubanchik from Rostov-on-Don, who served in the militia, and on whose initiative Oshchepkov held demonstrations in the Central High School militia, which, apart from himself, attended by graduates of the course in its entirety. The demonstration was a great success, then VS Oshchepkov immediately was invited to teach at this school police headquarters. In addition to the required course of unarmed combat,  Oshchepkov began to lead in TSVSHM and club work, which continued at the military faculty Infizkulta. The training program Oshchepkova and club activities in TSVSHM were eliminated in 1934 at the request of VA Spiridonov, saying that it was contrary to his own and formally approved by the program.

In 1932, when Infizkulte was established in the Military Department, teaching of martial arts and combat clothing as in the faculty and in organized courses carried with him to Oshchepkov. In the years 1933-1934 he also taught students a two-year school named after N. Unions Shvernik. In 1934 Vasily Sergeyevich creates its own section in the newly built Palace of Sports Aviakhim that in 1935 sends his apprentice, intern from Infizkulta AA Kharlampiev. In the summer of 1937 VS Oshchepkov achieved specialization opening Judo organized with Infizkulte High School coaches.

Arrest and death

On the night of 1 to 2 October 1937, Oschchepkov was arrested. He died in the Butyrka prison, officially of a heart attack.
In reality he was accused of being a Japanese spy and ten days after his arrest he was shot in the head for his fraternization with “Japanese imperialists.” In 1957  Vasili Oshchepkov  was posthumously pardoned and found innocent of any wrongdoing.

Personal life
Oshchepkov was married three times. He divorced his first wife Ekaterina Zhuravleva in 1924. He fell in love with a 17-year old countrywoman Maria Grigorievna from Alexandrovsk, who lived at that time in the same city. At 22, Maria died of tuberculosis. Later, Oshchepkov married Anna Ivanovna Kazembek.

In his later years, Oshchepkov began to struggle with health problems. Oshchepkov's pupils noted that he never showed himself naked. Some have concluded that he was concealing some skin disease. Trainee Kharlampiev and Oshchepkova AA Budzinskaya said that he was at the home of the teacher at the beginning of 1937 in an alley Medvedev. According to him, "Vasily Sergeyevich lying on the bed and I was sick, he has tormented heart disease, and he never parted with nitroglycerin.

Legacy
In the 2000s in various regions of Russia were organized clubs and tournaments Sambo memory Oshchepkova, including the All-Russian youth tournament in combat sambo in memory of Vasili Oshchepkov, including the Russian youth tournament in combat sambo named after Vasili Oshchepkov. During the meeting, the Board of the APEC in Vladivostok in September 2012, he was laid monument master.

In order to promote sambo in Russia and the world, as well as the formation of images in the public mind the heroes of the Fatherland on the example of the life and mission of St. Basil Oshchepkova and other worthy devotees on the initiative of a number of sports and public organizations in Russia , he launched a project named Vasili Oshchepkova project.

On September 9, 2012, the 120th anniversary of Oshchepkov's birthday was celebrated in Vladivostok's sports center, with participation of judokas from Japan and Russia.

In October, 2014, the World Sambo Championships were held for the first time in Japan where Oshchevpkov had learned judo.

In September, 2016, at Eastern Economic Forum in Vladivostok, Premier Abe of Japan, emphasizing the Russo-Japanese friendship, mentioned in his address: "I hope to visit 21 Korabelnaya Embankment where, as Mr. Putin would know well, Vasili Oshchepkov opened the first judo school in Russia."

On September 24, 2016, the sculpture by Peter Chegadayev of Vasili Oshchepkov receiving a black belt from Jigoro Kano, entitled "Fighting Tiger Cubs", was unveiled at the place where Oshchepkov had opened the first judo school in Russia.

Bibliography
 
 Лукашев М. Н. Сотворение самбо: родиться в царской тюрьме и умереть в сталинской. — М.: «Будо-Спорт», 2003. — 104 с. — .

References

1893 births
1937 deaths
Great Purge victims from Russia
Martial arts school founders
People convicted of treason
People convicted of treason against the Soviet Union
People from Alexandrovsk-Sakhalinsky District
Russian male judoka
Russian sambo practitioners
Soviet martial artists
White movement people